The Hon. Mary Monica Maxwell-Scott (2 October 1852 – 15 March 1920) was a Scottish author of historical novels and non-fiction and the great-granddaughter of the novelist Walter Scott.

She was born in Tunbridge Wells in Kent as Mary Monica Hope Scott in 1852, the only surviving child of James Hope-Scott (1812-1873) and his wife Charlotte Harriet Jane née Lockhart (1827-1858), daughter of John Gibson Lockhart and grand-daughter of the noted Scottish novelist Sir Walter Scott. Until her own children were born Mary Monica was the only living descendant of Sir Walter Scott. In 1868, as the heir to her father, she applied for a loan of £2,000 to have the land at Abbotsford House drained; as a minor she received her father's consent for the loan. On the death of her father in 1873 she inherited Abbotsford House, the home of Walter Scott. In London in 1874 she married the Hon Joseph Constable-Maxwell, third son of William, Lord Herries, following which the couple adopted the surname Maxwell-Scott. Like her great-grandfather, she became a writer of historical books. She also wrote a number of books about her famous ancestor including an authoritative guide to Scott’s collection of 'gabions' titled Abbotsford: a Guide to the Personal Relics and Possessions of Sir Walter Scott.

Mary Maxwell-Scott had eight children, five of whom survived her. These were: 
Margaret Mary Lucy Constable-Maxwell-Scott (d. 1912)
Maj.-Gen. Sir Walter Constable-Maxwell-Scott, 1st Baronet (1875-1954)
Mary Josephine Constable-Maxwell-Scott (1876-1922); married Alexander Dalglish in 1897
Winifride Mary Josephine Constable-Maxwell-Scott (1878-1880) 
Joseph Michael Constable-Maxwell-Scott (1880-1911)
Rear-Admiral Malcolm Raphael Joseph Constable-Maxwell-Scott (1883-1943)
Alice Mary Josephine Constable-Maxwell-Scott (1885-1908)
Herbert Francis Joseph Constable-Maxwell-Scott (1891-1962)

On her death in 1920 her eldest son, Sir Walter Constable-Maxwell-Scott, inherited Abbotsford House. Her grand-daughters were Patricia Maxwell-Scott (1921-1998) and Dame Jean Mary Monica Maxwell-Scott (1923-2004).

The Hon. Mary Monica Maxwell-Scott died at 7 Egerton Terrace in London in 1920 aged 67.

Publications include 
Catalogue of the Armour & Antiquities at Abbotsford (editor), Edinburgh, (1888) 
Abbotsford: The Personal Relics and Antiquarian Treasures of Sir Walter Scott (1893)
The Tragedy of Fotheringay, A. & C. Black, London (1895)
The Making of Abbotsford, and Incidents in Scottish History, Drawn from Various Sources (1897)
Henry Schomberg Kerr: Sailor and Jesuit, Longmans & Co, London (1901)
Alfred the Great, Catholic Truth Society, London (1902)
Joan of Arc, Sands & Co, London & Edinburgh (1905)
Gabriel Garcia Moreno (1908)
Madame Elizabeth de France, 1764-1794, Edward Arnold, London (1908)
The Life of Madame de la Rochejaquelein,  Longmans & Co, London (1911)
Thoughts on the Holy Angels. Selected by Hon. Mrs. Maxwell-Scott, Catholic Truth Society, London (1912)
St. Francis de Sales and his Friends, Sands & Co, London & Edinburgh (1913) 
The Teresa of Canada, London (1915)
Mary, Queen of Scots,  Catholic Truth Society, London (1935).

References

1852 births
1920 deaths
People from Royal Tunbridge Wells
People from Galashiels
Walter Scott
Scott family of Abbotsford
19th-century Scottish novelists
20th-century Scottish novelists
19th-century Scottish writers
19th-century Scottish women writers
20th-century Scottish women writers
19th-century Scottish people
20th-century Scottish people
19th-century Scottish women
20th-century Scottish women